A national academy is an organizational body, usually operating with state financial support and approval, that co-ordinates scholarly research activities and standards for academic disciplines, most frequently in the sciences but also the humanities. Typically the country's learned societies in individual disciplines will liaise with or be co-ordinated by the national academy. National academies play an important organisational role in academic exchanges and collaborations between countries.

The extent of official recognition of national academies varies between countries. In some cases they are explicitly or de facto an arm of government; in others, as in the United Kingdom, they are voluntary, non-profit bodies with which government has agreed to negotiate, and which may receive government financial support while retaining substantial independence. In some countries, a single academy covers all disciplines; an example is France. In others, there are several academies, which work together more or less closely; for example, Australia. In many states they are organized in academies of science. In the countries of the former Soviet Union, and in the People's Republic of China, the national academies have considerable power over policy and personnel in their areas. There is, however, a growing consensus among international federations of learned academies that bona fide national (or learned) academies need to adhere to certain criteria:
 The fellowship is elected, on the basis of excellence, by existing fellows (members)
 The number of fellows is restricted either to a total number or to a rate of accretion
 The governance of the academy is democratic and "bottom up". The fellowship is the ultimate source of the academy's authority
 The academy is independent of government, industry and professional associations. Most, if not all, academies derive some financial support from some or all of these other organisations but this support needs to be given in a manner that does not compromise the academy's independence.

United States 
In 1863, President of the United States Abraham Lincoln incorporated the United States National Academies of Sciences, Engineering, and Medicine (NASEM). The affiliated organisations were granted congressional charters to operate under the National Academy of Sciences. In 1916 President Woodrow Wilson reincorporated the organisation under the National Research Council to foster scientific research emphasising American industries. Today NASEM is composed of three non-profit member organisations: the National Academy of Sciences (NAS), the National Academy of Engineering (NAE), and the National Academy of Medicine (NAM) (after 2015; formerly Institute of Medicine (IoM)).

United Kingdom 
In the United Kingdom four national academies are the major learned societies of England: the Academy of Medical Sciences, British Academy, the Royal Academy of Engineering and the Royal Society. In addition, there are the Learned Society of Wales in Wales and the Royal Society of Edinburgh in Scotland.

List 

 Albania: Academy of Sciences of Albania
 Armenia: Armenian National Academy of Sciences
 Australia: Australian Academy of Science, Australian Academy of Technological Sciences and Engineering, Australian Academy of the Humanities, Academy of the Social Sciences in Australia, National Academies Forum
 Austria: Austrian Academy of Sciences
 Belarus: National Academy of Sciences of Belarus
 Belgium: Royal Academy of French Language and Literature of Belgium, Royal Academy of Dutch Language and Literature; see also Academies of Belgium
 Bosnia and Herzegovina: Academy of Sciences and Arts of Bosnia and Herzegovina
 Brazil: Brazilian Academy of Sciences
 Bulgaria: Bulgarian Academy of Sciences
 Canada: Royal Society of Canada
 Cambodia: Royal Academy of Cambodia
 Chile: Academia Chilena de Ciencias
 People's Republic of China: Chinese Academy of Sciences, Chinese Academy of Social Sciences, Chinese Academy of Agricultural Sciences, Chinese Academy of Engineering, Chinese Academy of Medical Sciences
 Hong Kong Special Administrative Region: Hong Kong Academy of the Humanities 香港人文學院
 Costa Rica – Academia Nacional de Ciencias (Costa Rica)
 Côte d'Ivoire – Académie des sciences, des arts, des cultures d'Afrique et des diasporas africaines
 Croatia: Croatian Academy of Sciences and Arts
 Czech Republic: Academy of Sciences of the Czech Republic
 Denmark: Royal Danish Academy of Sciences and Letters
 Estonia: Estonian Academy of Sciences
 Ethiopia: Imperial Academy (former)
 Finland:  The Finnish Academy of Science and Letters is a Finnish-speaking academy, while The Finnish Society of Science and Letters is bilingual. In the field of engineering, the Finnish Academy of Technology is bilingual while the Swedish Academy of Engineering Sciences in Finland Swedish-speaking. The Academy of Finland is not an academy in the sense of this article, but the state research funding agency.
 France: The Institut de France comprises five academies, including the Académie française and French Academy of Sciences.
 Georgia: Georgian National Academy of Sciences
 Germany: Leopoldina
 Ghana: Ghana Academy of Arts and Sciences
 Greece: Academy of Athens
 Hungary: Hungarian Academy of Sciences 
 India: The National Academy of Sciences, India; Indian National Science Academy; Indian Academy of Sciences; Indian National Academy of Engineering; Sahitya Akademi; National Bal Bhawan; Lalit Kala Akademi
 Indonesia: Indonesian Academy of Sciences
 Ireland: Royal Irish Academy
 Israel: Israel Academy of Sciences and Humanities
 Italy: Accademia dei Fisiocritici (National Academy of Sciences of Siena), Accademia dei Lincei for sciences, Accademia della Crusca for Italian language, Accademia nazionale delle scienze (detta dei XL); a general and supreme national academy was the Accademia d'Italia during the Fascist period.
 Japan: Japan Academy, Science Council of Japan
 Kosovo: Academy of Sciences and Arts of Kosovo
 Latvia: Latvian Academy of Sciences
 Lithuania: Lithuanian Academy of Sciences
 Netherlands: Royal Netherlands Academy of Arts and Sciences
 North Korea: Academy of Sciences of the Democratic People's Republic of Korea
 North Macedonia: Macedonian Academy of Sciences and Arts
 Norway: Norwegian Academy of Science and Letters
 Pakistan: Pakistan Academy of Letters, Pakistan Academy of Sciences
 Philippines: National Academy of Science and Technology
 Poland: Polish Academy of Sciences, Polish Academy of Learning
 Portugal: Academia das Ciências de Lisboa
 Romania: The Romanian Academy covers the scientific, artistic and literary domains.
 Russia: The Russian Academy of Sciences is the main organising body for fundamental sciences and humanities. There are also five independent specialised national academies: Russian Academy of Medical Sciences, Russian Academy of Architecture and Construction Sciences, Russian Academy of Education, Russian Academy of Agriculture Sciences, and Russian Academy of Arts. These are government-funded, but self-governing.
 San Marino: International Academy of Sciences San Marino
 Scotland: Royal Society of Edinburgh
 Serbia: Serbian Academy of Sciences and Arts
 Slovenia: Slovenian Academy of Sciences and Arts
 South Africa: Academy of Science of South Africa
 Spain: The Royal Academy is the main reference body for the spanish language. Royal Academy of Fine Arts of Saint Ferdinand covers the artistic fields; Real Academia de la Historia is the organising body for History; the Royal Academy of Moral and Political Sciences covers the humanities; Royal Academy of Exact, Physical and Natural Sciences covers natural sciences and mathematics; Royal Academy of Law covers the field of law.
 Sri Lanka: National Academy of Sciences of Sri Lanka
 Sweden: Swedish Academy for language, Royal Swedish Academy of Sciences
 Taiwan (Republic of China): Academia Sinica
 Thailand: Royal Institute of Thailand
 Turkey: Turkish Academy of Sciences is funded by the government but maintains autonomy
 Ukraine: National Academy of Sciences of Ukraine. Other state organizations also include National Academy of Arts of Ukraine, National Academy of Medical Sciences of Ukraine, National Academy of Agrarian Sciences of Ukraine, National Academy of Legal Sciences of Ukraine, National Academy of Pedagogical Sciences of Ukraine, Minor Academy of Sciences of Ukraine.
 United Kingdom: the Royal Society is recognised as the national academy for the sciences, the British Academy for the social sciences and the humanities, the Royal Academy of Engineering for engineering, and the Academy of Medical Sciences for medicine.
 United States: The National Academies of the United States include four organisations: the National Academy of Sciences (NAS), the National Academy of Engineering (NAE), the National Academy of Medicine (NAM), and the National Research Council (NRC).  See also American Academy of Arts and Sciences, American Academy of Arts and Letters, American Academy of Diplomacy, Academy of American Poets, National Academy of Design.
 Vatican City: Pontifical Academy of Sciences
 Vietnam: Vietnam Academy of Science and Technology (VAST)

Within most countries, the unqualified phrase "National Academy" will normally refer to that country's academy.  For example, within the United States, the plural phrase "National Academies" is widely understood to refer to the U.S. National Academies.

See also 
 Academy of Medicine (disambiguation)
 Academy of Sciences
 International Science Council

References